Maratus albus is a species of the peacock spider genus, characterised by its distinctive courtship display.

References

Further reading

External links
BBC News video
Australian Geographic video

Salticidae
Spiders of Australia
Spiders described in 2016